The Jaffna Tamil dialect is a Tamil dialect native to the Jaffna Peninsula and is the primary dialect used in Northern Sri Lanka. It is the oldest and most archaic of Tamil dialects in Sri Lanka and India. It is also very refined and considered to preserve many antique features of Old Tamil that predate Tolkāppiyam, the grammatical treatise of Tamil. The Jaffna Tamil dialect retained many forms of words and phonemes which were used in Sangam literature such as Tirukkuṛaḷ and Kuṟuntokai, which has gone out of vogue in most Indian Tamil dialects.

Consequently many consider the Jaffna dialect to be a more conservative form of Tamil.

Although, audibly, quite distinct from the spoken Tamil dialects of Tamil Nadu, it nevertheless shares a similar standard written Tamil as Tamil Nadu, but is not always mutually intelligible in colloquial forms. Similarly, Sri Lankan Tamil dialects are not mutually intelligible with Malayalam too though it has a similar intonation. 

A subdialect retained by the Paraiyar people of Kayts still retains a number of archaic words and Prakrit loans not found in any other dialects of Tamil. These drummers had historically played an important role as ritual players of drums at funerals and folk temples and as heralds and traditional weavers. They also maintained the family records of their feudal lords and even practised medicine and astrology in folk traditions

History

The Jaffna district is very close to South India, being separated by a narrow stretch of sea called the Palk Strait. In spite of the continual contact with India by sea, Sri Lankan Tamils have over the centuries become a distinct people developing dialects that differ in several aspects from the Indian Tamil dialects. The Jaffna Tamil dialect is also distinct to a lesser extent from that of the Eastern, Western and Upcountry Tamil dialects of Sri Lanka.

Pronunciation

Devoicing of [h] occurs in the Jaffna dialect, the voiceless plosives of the Jaffna dialects represent an antique feature of the pre-Sangam period. The Jaffna pronunciation [nitka]>[nikka] for nirka “to stand’ is likely to preserve the ancient plosive nature of /r/, which in colloquial middle Tamil inscriptions is already confounded with the dental trill in this position.

See also
Sri Lankan Tamil dialects
 Batticaloa Tamil dialect
 Negombo Tamil dialect

References

Languages of Sri Lanka
Jaffna District society
Sri Lankan Tamil society
Tamil dialects